John Leveson-Gower, 1st Baron Gower PC (7 January 1675 – 31 August 1709) was a member of the Leveson-Gower family. He was the son of Sir William Leveson-Gower, 4th Baronet and his wife Jane Granville. He was born in Sittenham, Yorkshire. His maternal grandparents were John Granville, 1st Earl of Bath and his wife Jane Wyche, daughter of Sir Peter Wyche.

Career

John Leveson-Gower was Tory MP for Newcastle-under-Lyme, 1692–1703. He was created Baron Gower of Sittenham in the County of York on 16 March 1703. He was made member of the Privy Council from 1702 to 1707, and he was appointed Chancellor of the Duchy of Lancaster from 1702 to 1706. He was Commissioner of the Union in 1706. He died on 31 August 1709 in Belvoir Castle, Grantham, Lincolnshire.

Family

John married Lady Catherine Manners (1675–1722), daughter of John Manners, 1st Duke of Rutland and his third wife Catherine Noel, in September 1692. They had six children:
John Leveson-Gower, 1st Earl Gower (1694–1754), who married and had issue from: firstly, Lady Evelyn Pierrepont, daughter of Evelyn Pierrepont, 1st Duke of Kingston-upon-Hull; secondly, Penelope Stonhouse, daughter of Sir John Stonhouse, 7th Baronet; thirdly, Lady Mary Tufton, daughter of Thomas Tufton, 6th Earl of Thanet.
William Leveson-Gower (d. 1756), MP for Stafford from 1720 to 1754. He married Anne Grosvenor, daughter of Sir Thomas Grosvenor, and had a daughter, Catherine.
Thomas Leveson-Gower, born 6 May 1699, Trentham, Staffordshire, died 12 August 1727, London, unmarried, MP for Newcastle-under-Lyme from 1720 until his death.
Baptist Leveson-Gower born 1701, died unmarried 4 August 1782, MP for Newcastle-under-Lyme from 1727 to 1761.
Katherine Leveson-Gower, died 20 April 1712, London, buried 1 May 1712, Lilleshall.
Jane Leveson-Gower (c. 1704 – 10 June 1726), married 5 January 1718/19, John Proby, who died 1760 and had issue, John Proby, 1st Baron Carysfort.

Ancestry

References

Burkes Peerage (1939 edition), s.v. Sutherland, Duke of

Gower, John Leveson-Gower, 1st Baron
Gower, John Leveson-Gower, 1st Baron
Gower, John Leveson-Gower, 1st Baron
Gower
John Leveson-Gower, 1st Baron Gower
English MPs 1690–1695
English MPs 1695–1698
English MPs 1698–1700
English MPs 1701
English MPs 1701–1702
English MPs 1702–1705
Members of the Parliament of England for Newcastle-under-Lyme
Chancellors of the Duchy of Lancaster